Ceanothus americanus is a species of Ceanothus shrub native to North America. Common names include New Jersey tea, Jersey tea ceanothus, variations of red root (red-root; redroot), mountain sweet (mountain-sweet; mountainsweet), and wild snowball. New Jersey tea was a name coined during the American Revolution, because its leaves were used as a substitute for imported tea.

Description
Its root system is thick with fibrous root hairs close to the surface, but with stout, burlish, woody roots that reach deep into the earth—root systems may grow very large in the wild, to compensate after repeated exposures to wildfires. White flowers grow in clumpy inflorescences on lengthy, axillary
peduncles. Fruits are dry, dehiscent, seed capsules.

Habitat
Ceanothus americanus is common on dry plains, prairies, or similar untreed areas, on soils that are sandy or rocky. It can often be located in forest clearings or verges, on banks or lakeshores, and on gentle slopes.

Distribution
Ceanothus americanus is found in Canada, in Ontario and Quebec. In the U.S., it is found in Alabama; Arkansas; Connecticut; Delaware; northern and central Florida; Georgia; Illinois; Indiana; Iowa; Kansas; Louisiana; Maine (in Oxford and Penobscot counties); Maryland; Massachusetts; Michigan; Minnesota; Mississippi; Missouri; Nebraska; New Hampshire; New Jersey; New York; North and South Carolina; Ohio; Oklahoma; Pennsylvania; Rhode Island; eastern and central Texas; Vermont; West Virginia; Wisconsin; and Virginia

Ecology
During winter in the Ozarks of Missouri, its twigs are sought as food by the local deer; and white-tailed deer (Odocoileus virginianus), in particular, will browse C. americanus year round.

The flowers of C. americanus are used as food by (and the shoots host the larvae of) butterflies in the genus Celastrina, including spring azure, and summer azure; and by Erynnis martialis (mottled duskywing) and Erynnis icelus (dreamy duskywing).

Ceanothus americanus seeds are consumed by wild turkeys and quail.

Constituents and medicinal use 
The red roots and root bark of New Jersey tea are used by Native Americans in North America for infections of the upper respiratory tract. The leaves have a fresh scent of wintergreen and were later utilized by the European colonizers as a tea substitute and stimulating caffeine-free beverage.  The root bark of the plant is used by herbalists today, and are used notably in remedies for problems of the lymph system. The root contains astringent tannins and a number of peptide alkaloids, including ceanothine A-E, pandamine, zizyphine, scutianine, and the adouetines. They have a mild hypotensive effect. Root and flower extracts can also be used as dyes.

References

External links
 

americanus
Flora of Eastern Canada
Flora of the Northeastern United States
Flora of the North-Central United States
Flora of the Southeastern United States
Flora of the South-Central United States
Flora of the Appalachian Mountains
Flora of the Great Lakes region (North America)
Plants described in 1753
Taxa named by Carl Linnaeus
Drinks
Plants used in Native American cuisine
Plants used in traditional Native American medicine
Garden plants of North America
Drought-tolerant plants
Flora without expected TNC conservation status